Grimaldi or The Life of an Actress is an 1855 play by the Irish writer Dion Boucicault. It was based on the life of the actor Joseph Grimaldi (1778-1837).

Film adaptation
In 1914 the play was turned into a silent film Grimaldi directed by Charles E. Vernon.

References

Bibliography
 Goble, Alan. The Complete Index to Literary Sources in Film. Walter de Gruyter, 1999.

1855 plays
British plays adapted into films
Plays set in London
Plays by Dion Boucicault